4792 Lykaon  is a dark Jupiter trojan from the Trojan camp, approximately  in diameter. It was discovered on 10 September 1988, by American astronomer Carolyn Shoemaker at the Palomar Observatory in California. The possibly elongated Jovian asteroid belongs to the 100 largest Jupiter trojans and has a long rotation period of 40.1 hours. It was named after the Trojan prince Lycaon from Greek mythology.

Orbit and classification 

Lykaon is a dark Jovian asteroid in a 1:1 orbital resonance with Jupiter. It is located in the trailering Trojan camp at the Gas Giant's  Lagrangian point, 60° behind its orbit . It is also a non-family asteroid of the Jovian background population. It orbits the Sun at a distance of 4.8–5.7 AU once every 12 years and 1 month (4,406 days; semi-major axis of 5.26 AU). Its orbit has an eccentricity of 0.09 and an inclination of 9° with respect to the ecliptic. The body's observation arc begins at Palomar with its official discovery observation in September 1988.

Physical characteristics 

In the SDSS-based taxonomy, Lykaon is a dark D-type asteroid, the most common spectral type among the larger Jupiter trojans. It has a typical V–I color index of 0.96.

Rotation period 

In April 1996, a rotational lightcurve of Lykaon was obtained from a total of six nights of photometric observations by Italian astronomer Stefano Mottola, using the Bochum 0.61-metre Telescope   at La Silla Observatory in northern Chile. Lightcurve analysis gave a rotation period of  hours with a brightness variation of 0.43 magnitude. A high brightness amplitude is indicative of a non-spherical shape. While not being a slow rotator, it has one of the longest periods among all larger Jupiter trojans (see table below).

Diameter and albedo 

According to the survey carried out by the NEOWISE mission of NASA's Wide-field Infrared Survey Explorer, Lykaon measures 50.87 kilometers in diameter and its surface has an albedo of 0.068, while the Collaborative Asteroid Lightcurve Link assumes a standard albedo for a carbonaceous asteroid of 0.057, and calculates a diameter of 53.16 kilometers based on an absolute magnitude of 10.1. No diameter estimate for this object was published by the IRAS and Akari (satellite) surveys.

Naming 

This minor planet was named by the discoverer from Greek mythology after the Trojan prince Lycaon, one of King Priam's many sons. He was captured by Achilles and sold as slave. Shortly after Lycaon returned to the Trojan War, he was slain by Achilles without mercy near the River Scamander. The official naming citation was published by the Minor Planet Center on 27 June 1991.

References

External links 
 Asteroid Lightcurve Database (LCDB), query form (info )
 Dictionary of Minor Planet Names, Google books
 Discovery Circumstances: Numbered Minor Planets (1)-(5000) – Minor Planet Center
 Asteroid 4792 Lykaon at the Small Bodies Data Ferret
 
 

004792
Discoveries by Carolyn S. Shoemaker
Named minor planets
19880910